Trayvone Reid (born 25 February 2000) is a Jamaican footballer who plays for Oakland Roots in the USL Championship.

Career
Reid began his career with Tivoli Gardens, before securing a loan move to Jamaica Premier League rivals Harbour View in 2022. Following a successful loan spell where he helped the team to win the league title, Harbour View made the deal permanent in September 2022. However, shortly after on 12 December 2022, Reid signed with USL Championship side Oakland Roots.

International career
In August 2022, Reid was called up to the Jamaica national team for a mini-tournemant in Austria. However, he didn't make an appearance.

References

Honors

Club
Harbour View
Jamaica National Premier League: 2022

External links
 

2000 births
Living people
Association football midfielders
Expatriate soccer players in the United States
Harbour View F.C. players
Jamaican expatriate footballers
Jamaican expatriate sportspeople in the United States
Jamaican footballers
National Premier League players
Oakland Roots SC players
Tivoli Gardens F.C. players
USL Championship players